Dünyayı Kurtaran Adam (English: The Man Who Saved the World) is a 1982 Turkish science fantasy martial arts superhero adventure film directed by Çetin Inanç, and starring actor/martial artist Cüneyt Arkın. It was first released in November 1982 by Anıt Ticaret in Turkey, and later in 2005 by BijouFlix Releasing in the United States.

The film is popularly known abroad as Turkish Star Wars, due to its notorious unauthorized use of footage, music and sound effects from Star Wars and other science fiction films. The film, part of a wave of  Turksploitation superhero films produced during the 1970s to early 1980s, combines science fiction themes with martial arts fantasy action, having more in common with 1970s Hong Kong martial arts films from Golden Harvest than with Star Wars.

The film was panned by critics and was often considered to be the one of the worst films ever made.

Plot
The film follows the adventures of Murat (Arkın) and Ali (Akkaya), whose spaceships crash on an alien desert planet following a battle, shown by using footage from Star Wars and newsreel clips of Soviet and American rocket launches. While hiking across the desert, they speculate that the planet is inhabited only by women. Ali does his wolf-whistle, which he uses on attractive women. However, he blows the wrong whistle and they are attacked by skeletons on horseback, which they defeat in hand-to-hand combat.

The main villain soon shows up and captures the heroes, bringing them to his gladiatorial arena so they can fight. The villain tells them he is actually from Earth and is a 1,000-year-old wizard. He tried to defeat Earth, but was always repelled by a "shield of concentrated human brain molecules" (depicted with footage of the Death Star). The only way he can bypass this impenetrable defense is to use a human brain against it.

The heroes escape and hide in a cave full of refugees who already fled the villain's tyrannical rule. Murat develops a romantic connection with the only woman there (Uçar), who looks after the children. (The implied romance is shown through many long eye contacts and smiles from the girl, but nothing more.) Zombies of the dark lord attack the cave and turn several of the children into zombies, their blood used to renew the evil wizard's immortality. The three then flee the cave and find a local bar (footage of the Mos Eisley cantina lifted directly from Star Wars). The two men quickly get into a bar brawl, but the villain suddenly appears and captures them again.

The wizard separates the men and tries to convince them to join him. He sends his queen to seduce Ali, while he orders Murat to be brought before him. He offers Murat the chance to rule over the earth and stars if he joins him. He possesses the power of Earth's ancestry in the form of a golden brain, and all he needs to conquer Earth is a real human brain. After Murat declines, the wizard shows that he has the woman and child in captivity. Enraged, Murat fights the wizard's monsters and skeleton guardians. Meanwhile, monsters attack Ali when he is about to kiss the queen. He defeats the monsters and joins Murat's fight. They are both disabled by laser-armed guards and then unsuccessfully tortured by the wizard. Finally, the wizard pits Murat against a giant monster in the arena. Murat defeats the monster and flees, taking the woman and the child with him. Ali is left in captivity.

Murat finds out about a sword made by "the 13th clan," who melted a mountain thousands of "space years" ago. Murat later finds this sword, shaped like a lightning bolt, in a cave defended by two golden ninjas. He takes the sword after dispatching the guards in an uncharacteristically short fight. Renewed by the sword's power, Murat goes to free his friend from the sorcerer's dungeon. However, Ali becomes envious of the sword, knocks out Murat, and takes both the sword and the golden brain. The wizard then uses trickery and deceit to make Ali hand over the artifacts. Having touched these items, the wizard now has increased powers and traps Murat, Ali, the woman, and the child. Ali is killed in a foolish attempt to escape.

Grief-stricken, Murat decides to melt down the golden sword and the golden human brain and forge them into a pair of gauntlets and boots. Equipped with magical gloves and super-jumping boots, he searches for the sorcerer to avenge his friend's death. After fighting numerous monsters and skeletons, he comes face-to-face with his nemesis and karate chops him in half. He then leaves the planet for Earth in a ship that suspiciously resembles the Millennium Falcon.

Cast
Cüneyt Arkın as Murat
  as Ali
 Necla Fide as Queen
 Hüseyin Peyda as Bilgin
 Hikmet Taşdemir as Sihirbaz
 Füsun Uçar as Bilgin's women
 Aydın Haberdar as creature
 Mehmet Uğur as creature
 Kadir Kök as creature
 Yadigar Ejder as creature
 Sönmez Yıkılmaz as Robot creature
 Nihat Yiğit as Beating Man At The Bar

Directed by Çetin İnanç and written by Cüneyt Arkın, a well-known Turkish actor whose works span the last five decades, the film also starred Arkın in the leading role. Other actors include Aytekin Akkaya who later starred in the Italian film Sopravvissuti della città morta, as well as Hüseyin Peyda and Füsun Uçar both of whom remained in Turkey.

Soundtrack
The musical soundtrack is entirely lifted from popular movies. The main theme used is "The Raiders March", composed by John Williams, from the 1981 film Raiders of the Lost Ark. Other scenes incorporated the music of Moonraker, Ben-Hur, Flash Gordon, Giorgio Moroder's version of Battlestar Galactica, Planet of the Apes, Silent Running, Moses and Disney's Black Hole. In the scene where Cüneyt Arkın and Aytekin Akkaya find the graves of old civilizations, the director selected Johann Sebastian Bach's Toccata to play. Music from Star Wars''' Academy Award winning John Williams score appears, but less extensively than footage from the film.

Reception
Upon its initial release, the film was negatively reviewed by critics  for its incoherent storyline, poor performances, and use of footage and music from other films.

Despite this (or possibly due to this), the film has gained a significant cult following over the years and is considered to be one of the worst films ever made. Louis Proyect of Rec Arts Movie Reviews called the film "classic midnight movie fun." Phil Hall of Film Threat gave the film a perfect 5 stars, calling it "jaw-droppingly insane ... a film that makes criticism moot."

David Elroy Goldweber has criticized the "Turkish Star Wars" fan title. He notes that, while the film has science fiction themes, it is more of a martial arts fantasy film that has much more in common with 1970s Hong Kong martial arts films from Golden Harvest than it does with Star Wars. BBC News notes that Dünyayı Kurtaran Adam was part of a wave of low-budget Turkish superhero films produced during the 1970s to early 1980s.

Sequel

After many attempts to gather the original actors in the film to create a sequel to The Man Who Saved the World, a follow-up, The Son of the Man Who Saved the World (Dünyayı Kurtaran Adam'ın Oğlu), commonly known as Turks in Space, was shot in 2006.

The sequel was released on 15 December 2006. Some fans expressed their disapproval that the special effects were not similar to the original film, where all the space scenes were ripped directly from science fiction titles of the time, such as Star Wars, the Star Trek series, and Battlestar Galactica. Famous actors from Turkey, such as Mehmet Ali Erbil took part, and Kartal Tibet directed.

 Plans for an alternate sequel by Çetin İnanç 
Çetin Inanç has proposed his own ideas for a much grander sequel.

Involving the creation of "zombie ninja space warriors," and the abduction of the Turkish and American presidents by aliens, and a journey to a planet that is on the other side of a black hole.

It's all for a story that, according to Çetin İnanç, pits God against the Devil in an epic war for Earth.

Revivals
Foleyvision, an Austin, Texas-based comedy troupe who showed films replacing the original soundtrack with new dialogue, music, and sound-effects live in the theatre, used Dünyayı Kurtaran Adam as one of their performances in 2004, providing what troupe leader Buzz Moran said was "the first English translation of this film ever in the world." During the introduction to the show, Moran stated that the translator had told them that "It doesn't make any more sense in Turkish."

Filmusik, a Portland, Oregon-based collaborative performance group, similarly screened Turkish Star Wars'' with live voiceovers, music, and sound effects in late 2012.

Restoration 
In 2016, film historian Ed Glaser purchased the only known surviving 35mm print of the film from a retired projectionist. As a result, the film received a 2K scan whose quality far surpassed any previously available copy (until then, the film had only been available in versions sourced from a poor quality videotape). Glaser's restoration went on to receive a limited theatrical release in the United Kingdom in 2018. This restoration received a limited Blu-ray release from Big Bosphorus Media, being sold from October 1 to October 31, 2021.

See also
Mockbuster
List of cult films
List of films considered the worst

References

External links
 
 
 Dünyayı Kurtaran Adam on Nanarland 
 Review/commentary of Dunyayi Kurtaran Adam at The Wave magazine

1982 films
1982 martial arts films
1980s adventure films
1980s science fiction action films
1980s superhero films
Films directed by Çetin İnanç
Films involved in plagiarism controversies
Films set in Turkey
Films set on fictional planets
Films shot in Turkey
Martial arts fantasy films
Martial arts science fiction films
Post-apocalyptic films
Space adventure films
Star Wars fandom
Unofficial Star Wars films
Turkish adventure films
Turkish films about revenge
1980s Turkish-language films
Turkish science fiction action films
Turkish superhero films
1980s rediscovered films